Hassan Golestaneh (born 21 March 1983) is the first world medalist for Iran in the field of fitness, world champion and bodybuilding coach. He is the son of Enayatollah Golestaneh (the father of Iranian incident writing: he was the first person who started writing incident news in Iranian newspapers) and a descendant of Seyyed Ali Akbar Golestaneh.

Early life and amateur career 
Hassan Golestaneh first became interested in football was 10 years old, he followed professionally under the supervision of great masters : Mohammad Panjali , and Nasser Hejazi. He started bodybuilding at the age of 14. when he was 19 he had to Retire from football due to an accident causing him an injury in the ankle so he pursued jujitsu for 7 years and won several medals. From 2009 to 2015, he started the first private dispatch to fitness competitions in several countries of the world in the form of the Iranian team, which led to receiving the 2015 Best Coach Award. And due to his physique, he decided to do fitness professionally, in 2016, he succeeded in participating in physical fitness competitions and was able to bring the first Iranian fitness medalist and become worldwide runner-up. After this success, Iranian newspapers named him as the history maker of Iranian fitness. Also in 2017, he was able to enter the United States as the first Iranian athlete while persians were banned from the United States and became one of the top 10  American Arnold Classic models.  In the same year, he won a gold medal at the World Fitness Championships in the United States. He is the founder of fitness in Iran. For the first time, he was able to become a fitness championship referee and obtained his international professional refereeing booklet in the UAE World Championships from the chairmanship of the World Referees Committee, and broke the barrier of professional refereeing in Iran. Mr. Fitness Iran ( Hassan Golestaneh )  was elected President of the Deaf people's association . In an interview with Yektapress, the Iranian newspaper, Hassan Golestaneh spoke about the restrictions on Iranian women due to the Islamic Republic. This sport has no restrictions for Iranian women.

Responsibilities 
 
 Official and exclusive representative of the International Fitness Federation in Iran and Armenia
 President of the Fitness Association of the Deaf Federation of Iran
 Chairman of Shemiranat Fitness Committee Iran
 Secretary of the Sports Working Group of the Iranian Entrepreneurs Association
 Senior Advisor to the Athletes' House (President Iran)
 Official member of the European Fitness Association
 International Fitness and Bodybuilding Referee
 The first international professional referee for bodybuilding and fitness in Iran
 Chairman of Shemiranat Cross Training Committee

Shemiranat and Lavasanat committee 
According to a ruling by doctor Qomi, the head of the Shemiranat sports department, Hassan Golestaneh was appointed as the head of the Shemiranat and Lavasanat committee.

Hassan Golestaneh in the sports speech of the Islamic Council 
This meeting was held by the efforts of the Islamic Council's sports faction and with the presence of parliament members and the speech of Hassan Golestaneh, the head of the physical fitness committee of the parliament, and Afshin Moulai, the chairman of the federation of public sports.

He is also active in film and music advertising. the song he recently worked on as a international advertising manager is (A Letter To Eve) sung by Kianoosh Rouhi aka Kia Rouhi.

References

External links 

 

Living people
1983 births
Iranian bodybuilders